This is a list of windmills in the English county of Somerset.

Locations

A - B

C - E

G - H

K - M

N - P

S - U

W

Maps
1660 Newcourt
1675 John Ogilby
1736 John Kirby
1736* Strachey
1760 Bowen
1769 Donn
1782 Day & Masters
1783 Joseph Hodgkinson
1822 C & J Greenwood
1825 C & J Greenwood
1817 Ordnance Survey
1826 Andrew Bryant
1838 Ordnance Survey

Notes

Mills in bold are still standing, known building dates are indicated in bold. Text in italics denotes indicates that the information is not confirmed, but is likely to be the case stated.

Sources

Unless otherwise indicated, the source for all entries is

References

History of Somerset
Windmills in Somerset
Lists of windmills in England
Windmills